This is a list of English language words borrowed from indigenous languages of the Americas, either directly or through intermediate European languages such as Spanish or French. It does not cover names of ethnic groups or place names derived from indigenous languages.

Most words of Native American/First Nations language origin are the common names for indigenous flora and fauna, or describe items of Native American or First Nations life and culture. Some few are names applied in honor of Native Americans or First Nations peoples or due to a vague similarity to the original object of the word. For instance, sequoias are named in honor of the Cherokee leader Sequoyah, who lived 2,000 miles (3200 km) east of that tree's range, while the kinkajou of South America was given a name from the unrelated North American wolverine.

Words from Algonquian languages

Since Native Americans and First Nations peoples speaking a language of the Algonquian group were generally the first to meet English explorers and settlers along the Eastern Seaboard, many words from these languages made their way into English.

Canadian provinces and U.S. states, districts, counties and municipalities bear Algonquian names, such as Québec, Ottawa, Saskatchewan, Nantucket, Massachusetts, Naugatuck, Connecticut, Wyoming, District of Keewatin, Outagamie County, Wisconsin and Chicago, Illinois, or Algonquian-derived names, such as Algoma.

Furthermore, some indigenous peoples of the Americas groups are known better by their Algonquian exonyms, rather than by their endonym, such as the Eskimo (see below), Winnebago (perhaps from ), Sioux (ultimately from ), Assiniboine and Chipewyan.

Apishamore (definition) From a word in an Algonquian language meaning "something to lie down upon" (c.f. Ojibwe ).
Atamasco lily (definition) Earlier "attamusca", from Powhatan.
Babiche (definition) From Míkmaq ápapíj (from ápapi, "cord, thread", Proto-Algonquian *aʔrapa·pyi, from *aʔrapy-, "net" + *-a·by-, "string".
Caribou (definition) From Míkmaq qalipu, "snow-shoveler" (from qalipi, "shovel snow", Proto-Algonquian *maka·ripi-).
Caucus (definition) The etymology is disputed: two possible sources are an Algonquian word for "counsel", 'cau´-cau-as´u'; or the Algonquian , meaning an advisor, talker, or orator.
Chipmunk (definition) Originally "chitmunk," from Odawa jidmoonh  (c.f. Ojibwe ajidamoo(nh)), "American red squirrel".
Cisco (definition) Originally "siscowet," from Ojibwe language bemidewiskaawed "greasy-bodied [fish]".
Eskimo (definition) From Old Montagnais aiachkimeou (modern ayassimēw), meaning "snowshoe-netter" (often incorrectly claimed to be from an Ojibwe word meaning "eaters of raw [meat]"), and originally used to refer to the Mikmaq.
Hackmatack (definition) From an Algonquian language akemantak (c.f. Ojibwe aagimaandag), "snowshoe boughs".
Hickory (definition) From Powhatan <pocohiquara>, "milky drink made with hickory nuts".
Hominy (definition) From Powhatan <uskatahomen>/<usketchaumun>, literally "that which is treated", in this case "that which is ground/beaten".
Husky (definition) Ultimately from a variant form of the word "Eskimo" (see above).
Kinkajou (definition) From an Algonquian word meaning "wolverine" (c.f. Algonquin kwingwaage, Ojibwe gwiingwa'aage), through French .
Kinnikinnick (definition) From Unami Delaware , "mixture" (c.f. Ojibwe  "to mix something animate with something inanimate"), from Proto-Algonquian *kereken-, "mix (it) with something different by hand".
Mackinaw (definition) From , from Menomini mishilimaqkināhkw, "be large like a snapping turtle", or from Ojibwe mishi-makinaak, "large snapping turtle" with French , "island".
Moccasin (definition) From an Algonquian language, perhaps Powhatan <mockasin>, reconstituted as (c.f. Ojibwe makizin, Míkmaq mɨkusun, from Proto-Algonquian *maxkeseni).
Moose (definition) From Eastern Abenaki moz, reinforced by cognates from other Algonquian languages (e.g. Massachusett/Narragansett moos, Ojibwe moo(n)z, Lenape mus 'elk'), from Proto-Algonquian *mo·swa.
Mugwump (definition) From "mugquomp", a shortening of Massachusett <muggumquomp>, "war chief" (Proto-Algonquian *memekwa·pe·wa, from *memekw-, "swift" + *-a·pe·, "man").
Muskellunge (definition) Ultimately from Ojibwe , "ugly pike" (c.f. ginoozhe, "pike").
Muskeg (definition) From Cree , "swamp" (Proto-Algonquian *maškye·kwi).
Muskrat (definition) A folk-etymologized reshaping of earlier "musquash", from Massachusett (c.f. Western Abenaki mòskwas), apparently from Proto-Algonquian *mo·šk, "bob (at the surface of the water)" + *-exkwe·-, "head" + a derivational ending).
Proto-Algonquian , "white dog").
Papoose (definition) From Narragansett <papoòs> or Massachusett <pappouse>, "baby".
Pecan (definition) From Illinois pakani (c.f. Ojibwe bagaan), "nut", from Proto-Algonquian *paka·ni.
Pemmican (definition) From Cree pimihkān, from pimihkēw, "to make grease" (Proto-Algonquian *pemihke·wa, from *pemy-, "grease" + -ehke·, "to make").
While the final element reflects Proto-Algonquian *-min, "fruit, berry", the initial is unknown.
Pipsissewa (definition) From Abenaki kpipskwáhsawe, "flower of the woods".
Pokeweed (definition) Probably from "puccoon" (see below) + "weed".
Pone (definition) From Powhatan <poan>/<appoans>, "something roasted" (reconstituted as ) (c.f. Ojibwe abwaan), from Proto-Algonquian *apwa·n.
Powwow (definition) From Narragansett powwaw, "shaman" (Proto-Algonquian *pawe·wa, "to dream, to have a vision").
Unami Delaware , 'red dye; the plant from which dye is made').
Pung A low box-like sleigh designed for one horse. Shortened form of "tom-pung" (from the same etymon as "toboggan") from an Algonquian language of Southern New England.
Punkie (definition) Via Dutch, from Munsee  (Proto-Algonquian *penkwehsa, from *penkw-, "dust, ashes" + *-ehs, a diminutive suffix).
Quahog (definition) From Narragansett <poquaûhock>.
Quonset hut (definition) From an Algonquian language of southern New England, possibly meaning "small long place" (with <qunni->, "long" + <-s->, diminutive + <-et>, locative).
Sachem (definition) From an Algonquian language of southern New England, c.f. Narragansett <sâchim> (Proto-Eastern Algonquian *sākimāw, "chief").
Sagamore (definition) From Eastern Abenaki sakəma (c.f. Narragansett <sâchim>), "chief", from Proto-Eastern Algonquian *sākimāw.
Scup (definition) Shortened from scuppaug, which is from Narragansett mishcùppaûog.
Shoepac (definition) From Unami Delaware  "shoes" (singular ), altered on analogy with English "shoe".
Skunk (definition) From Massachusett <squnck> (Proto-Algonquian *šeka·kwa, from *šek-, "to urinate" + *-a·kw, "fox").
Squash (fruit) (definition) From Narragansett <askútasquash>.
Squaw (definition) From Massachusett <squa> (c.f. Cree iskwē, Ojibwe ikwe), "woman", from Proto-Algonquian *eθkwe·wa.
Succotash (definition) From Narragansett <msíckquatash>, "boiled whole kernels of corn" (Proto-Algonquian *mesi·nkwete·wari, singular *mesi·nkwete·, from *mes-, "whole" + *-i·nkw-, "eye [=kernel]" + -ete·, "to cook").
Tabagie (definition)  From Algonquin .
Tautog (definition)  From Narragansett tautaũog.
Terrapin (definition) Originally "torope," from an Eastern Algonquian language, perhaps Powhatan (reconstituted as ) (c.f. Munsee Delaware ), from Proto-Eastern Algonquian *tōrəpēw.
Toboggan (definition) From Míkmaq topaqan or Maliseet-Passamaquoddy  (Proto-Algonquian *weta·pye·kani, from *wet-, "to drag" + *-a·pye·-, "cordlike object" + *-kan, "instrument for").
Tomahawk (definition) From Powhatan <tamahaac> (Proto-Algonquian *temaha·kani, from *temah-, "to cut" + *-a·kan, "instrument for").
Totem (definition) From Ojibwe nindoodem, "my totem" or odoodeman, "his totem," referring to a kin group.
Tullibee (definition) From Old Ojibwe  (modern odoonibii).
Wampum (definition) Earlier "wampumpeag", from Massachusett, and meaning "white strings [of beads]" (c.f. Maliseet: wapapiyik, Eastern Abenaki wápapəyak, Ojibwe waabaabiinyag), from Proto-Algonquian *wa·p-, "white" + *-a·py-, "string-like object" + *-aki, plural.
Wanigan (definition) From Ojibwa , "storage pit".
Wapiti (elk) (definition) From Shawnee waapiti, "white rump" (c.f. Ojibwe waabidiy), from Proto-Algonquian *wa·petwiya, from *wa·p-, "white" + *-etwiy, "rump".
Wickiup (definition) From Fox wiikiyaapi, from the same Proto-Algonquian etymon as "wigwam" (see below).
Wigwam (definition) From Eastern Abenaki wìkəwam (c.f. Ojibwe wiigiwaam), from Proto-Algonquian *wi·kiwa·Hmi.
Woodchuck (definition) Reshaped on analogy with "wood" and "chuck", from an Algonquian language of southern New England (c.f. Narragansett <ockqutchaun>, "woodchuck").

Words from Nahuatl

Unless otherwise specified,  is among the sources used for each etymology
Words of Nahuatl origin have entered many European languages. Mainly they have done so via Spanish.

Achiote (definition) from  
Atlatl (definition) from  
Atole (definition) from  
Aztec (definition) from  'coming from Aztlan', via Spanish Azteca
Cacao (definition) and Cocoa (definition) from  
Chayote (definition) from  
Chia (definition) from    
Chicle (definition) from  
Chili (definition) from  
Chipotle (definition) from  'smoked chili', from chili + poctli 'smoke'
However, the form  is not directly attested, and  does not appear in Nahuatl until the mid-18th century. Some researchers have recently proposed that the  element was originally , and referred to a special wooden stick used to prepare chocolate.
Copal (definition) from 
Coyote (definition) from  via Spanish
Epazote (definition) from 
Hoatzin (definition) from 
Jicama (definition) from 
Nixtamalization (definition) from 
Ocelot (definition) from   'jaguar', via French
 Ocotillo (definition) from ocotl 'pine, torch made of pine', via Mexican Spanish ocote + diminutive -illo
Nahuatl probably borrowed the root  from another language, but the source is not known.
Sapodilla (definition) from 
Sapota (definition) from  
Sotol (definition) from 
The Spanish plural is tamales, and the English derives from a false singular tamale.
Tequila from  'work' +  'place'
Tlacoyo (definition) from  
The change from tomate to tomato was likely influenced by the spelling of potato

Words from Quechua
Unless otherwise specified, Words in English from Amerindian Languages is among the sources used for each etymology

A number of words from Quechua have entered English, mostly via Spanish, adopting Hispanicized spellings.

Ayahuasca (definition) from aya "corpse" and waska "rope", via Spanish 
Cachua (definition) from qhachwa
Chinchilla(definition) possibly from Quechua. May be from Spanish chinche
Chuño (definition) from ch'uñu
Coca (definition) from kuka, via Spanish 
Cocaine (definition) from kuka (see above), probably via French 
Condor (definition) from kuntur, via Spanish 
Gran Chaco (definition) from chaku, "hunt"
Guanaco (definition) from wanaku
Guano (definition) from wanu via Spanish 
Inca (definition) from Inka "lord, king"
Jerky (definition) from ch'arki, via Spanish 
Lagniappe (definition) from yapay, "add, addition", via Spanish  (with the definite article la).
Lima (definition) from rimay, "speak" (from the name of the city, named for the Rimaq river ("speaking river"))
Llama (definition) from llama, via Spanish
Lucuma (definition) from lukuma, via Spanish
Mashua (definition) from maswa
Pampa (definition) from pampa, "a large plain", via Spanish
Pisco (definition) from pisqu, "bird"
Puma (definition) from puma, via Spanish
Quinine (definition) from kinakina, via Spanish 
Quinoa (definition) from kinwa, via Spanish 
Quipu (definition) from khipu, via Spanish 
Soroche (definition) from suruqchi or suruqch'i, "Altitude sickness"
Vicuña (definition) from wik'uña, via Spanish 
Viscacha (definition) from wisk'acha, via Spanish

Words from Eskimo–Aleut languages
 Anorak (definition) from Greenlandic Inuit annoraaq
 Chimo (definition) from the Inuktitut word saimo (ᓴᐃᒧ , a word of greeting, farewell, and toast before drinking. Used as a greeting and cheer by the Canadian Military Engineers, and more widely in some parts of Southern Ontario and Western Canada, particularly in Saskatoon, Saskatchewan 
 Igloo (definition) from Inuktitut iglu (ᐃᒡᓗ )
 Ilanaaq (definition) Inuktitut ilanaaq (ᐃᓚᓈᒃ ), "friend". Name of the logo for the 2010 Winter Olympics
 Inuksuk  (definition) from Inuktitut inuksuk (ᐃᓄᒃᓱᒃ )
 Kayak (definition) from Inuktitut qajaq (ᖃᔭᖅ )
 Malamute (definition) from Inupiaq Malimiut, the name of an Inupiaq subgroup
 Mukluk (definition) from Yupik maklak, "bearded seal"
 Nanook (definition) from Inuktitut word for polar bear Nanuq (ᓇᓄᒃ ), "polar bear", made famous in English due to a 1922 documentary Nanook of the North, featuring a man with this name.
 Nunatak (definition) from Greenlandic Inuit  nunataq
 Tiktaalik (definition) from Inuktitut tiktaalik (ᑎᒃᑖᓕᒃ ), "large freshwater fish"
 Umiaq (definition)

Words from Arawakan languages
Anole (definition) from an Arawakan language, or possibly Cariban, via French anolis.
Barbecue (definition) from an Arawakan language of Haiti barbakoa, "framework of sticks", via Spanish barbacoa.
Buccaneer (definition) from an Arawakan language buccan, "a wooden frame on which Taínos and Caribs slowly roasted or smoked meat",via French boucane.
Cacique or cassique (definition) from Taíno cacike or Arawak  "chieftain"
Caiman  (definition) from a Ta-Maipurean language, "water spirit" (c.f. Garifuna ), though possibly ultimately of African origin.
Canoe (definition) from Taíno via Spanish canoa.
Cassava (definition) from Taíno caçabi, "manioc meal", via Spanish or Portuguese.
Cay (definition) from Taíno, via Spanish .
Guaiac (definition) from Taíno guayacan via Spanish and Latin.
Guava (definition) from an Arawakan language, by way of Spanish .
Hammock (definition) from Taíno, via Spanish .
Hurricane (definition) from Taíno hurakán, via Spanish.
Iguana (definition) from an Arawakan language iwana.
Macana (definition) from Taíno macana via Spanish.
Maize (definition) from Taíno mahís, via Spanish.
Mangrove (definition) from Taíno, via Spanish mangle or Portuguese mangue.
Papaya (definition) from Taíno.
Potato (definition) from Taíno or Haitian Carib batata 'sweet potato', via Spanish patata.
Savanna (definition) from Taíno zabana, via Spanish.
Tobacco (definition) probably from an Arawakan language, via .
Yuca (definition) from Taíno, via Spanish.

Words from Tupi-Guaraní
Acai (definition) from Tupi *ɨβasaí, via Brazilian Portuguese assaí, uaçaí, açaí.
Ani (definition) from Tupi *anúʔí.
Agouti (definition) from Tupi–Guaraní akutí, via Portuguese aguti through French.
Cashew (definition) from Tupí acaîu, via Portuguese caju.
Capybara  (definition) from Guaraní kapibári 'the grass eater ' via Portuguese capivara through French.
Catupiry (definition) from Guaraní katupyry via Brazilian Portuguese.
Cayenne (definition) from Tupí kyinha via French.
Cougar (definition) ultimately corrupted from Guaraní guaçu ara.
Jaguar (definition) from Tupinambá via Portuguese jaguar through French ,.
Jaguarundi (definition) from Guaraní via Portuguese.
Maraca (definition) from Tupí maraka via Portuguese.
Macaw (definition) via Portuguese Macau from Tupi macavuana, which may be the name of a type of palm tree the fruit of which the birds eat.
Manioc (definition) from Tupinambá via Portuguese man(d)ioca through French .
Petunia (definition) from Tupí petun 'smoke' via Portuguese.
Piranha (definition) from Tupí pirã́ja, pirã́nʸa, from pirá 'fish' + ã́ja, ã́nʸa 'tooth', via Portuguese.
Seriema (definition)from Tupinambá siriema 'the crested one' via Portuguese
Tapioca (definition) from Tupinambá  'juice squeezed out', from tipi 'residue, dregs' + og, ok 'to squeeze out', via Portuguese.
Tapir (definition) from Tupinambá via Portuguese tapir through French .
Tegu (definition) from Tupinambá teiú-guaçú 'big lizard' via Portuguese teiú
Toucan (definition) from Tupinambá via Portuguese tucano through French , via Portuguese and French.

Words from other indigenous languages of the Americas
Abalone (definition) from Rumsen awlun and Ohlone aluan, via Spanish abulón.
Alpaca (definition) from Aymara allpaka, via Spanish.
Appaloosa (definition) Either named for the Palouse River, whose name comes from Sahaptin palú:s, "what is standing up in the water"; or for Opelousas, Louisiana, which may come from Choctaw api losa, "black body".
Barracuda (definition) from Spanish, perhaps originally from Carib.
Bayou (definition) from early Choctaw bayuk, "creek, river", via French.
Camas (definition) from Nez Perce .
Cannibal (definition) via Spanish Caníbalis, from a Cariban language, meaning "person, Indian", (Proto-Cariban *karípona), based on the Spaniards' belief that the Caribs ate human flesh.
Catalpa (definition) from Creek katałpa "head-wing", with (i)ká, "head" + (i)táłpa, "wing".
Cenote (definition) from Yucatec Maya dzonot or ts'onot meaning "well".
Cheechako (definition) from Chinook Jargon  + chako, "new come". Chee comes from Lower Chinook čxi, "straightaway", and for chako c.f. Nuuchahnulth čokwaa, "come!"
Chicha via Spanish from Kuna chichab, "maize" or from Nahuatl , "fermented water."
Chinook (definition) from Lower Chehalis , the name of a village, via Chinook Trade Jargon.

Chuckwalla (definition) from Cahuilla čáxwal.
Coho (definition) from Halkomelem k̉ʷə́xʷəθ.
Coontie (definition) from Creek conti hetaka.
Coypu (definition) from Mapudungun coipu, via American Spanish coipú'.
Degu (definition) from Mapudungun deuñ, via Spanish.
Divi-divi (definition) from Cumanagoto.
Dory (definition) from Miskito dóri, dúri.Eulachon (definition) from a Cree adaptation of Chinook Trade Jargon ulâkân, itself a borrowing of Clatsap u-tlalxwə(n), "brook trout".
Gaucho (definition) via Spanish, probably from a South American indigenous language, cf. Araucanian cauchu 'wanderer'.
Geoduck (definition) from Lushootseed (Nisqually) gʷídəq.
Guan (definition) from Kuna kwama.
High muckamuck (definition) from Chinook Jargon , "eat, food, drink", of unknown origin.
Hogan (definition) from Navajo hooghan.
Hooch (definition) a shortening of "Hoochinoo", the name of a Tlingit village, from Tlingit xutsnuuwú, "brown bear fort".

Kachina (definition) from Hopi katsína, "spirit being".
Jojoba (definition) via Spanish, from some Uto-Aztecan language, cf. O'odham hohowai and Yaqui hohoovam.
Kiva (definition) from Hopi kíva (containing ki-, "house").
Kokanee (definition) perhaps from Twana kəknǽxw.Manatee (definition) via Spanish manatí, from a word in a Cariban language meaning "(woman's) breast".
Ohunka from Lakota "false", "untrue".
Peccary (definition) from Galilbi Carib pakira.
Piki (definition) from Hopi.
Pogonip (definition) from Shoshone , "fog".
Poncho (definition) from Mapudungun pontho "woolen fabric", via Spanish.
Potlatch (definition) from Nuuchahnulth (Nootka) p̉aƛp̉ač (reduplication of p̉a, "to make ceremonial gifts in potlatch", with the iterative suffix -č) via Chinook Jargon.

Salal (definition) from Chinook Trade Jargon , from Lower Chinook salál.
Saguaro (definition) via Spanish, from some indigenous language, possibly Opata.
Sasquatch (definition) From Halkomelem .
Sego (definition) from Ute-Southern Paiute .
Sequoia (definition) from a Cherokee personal name, <Sikwayi>, with no further known etymology.
Sockeye (definition) from Halkomelem .
Skookum (definition) from Chinook Jargon , "powerful, supernaturally dangerous", from Lower Chehalis skʷəkʷə́m, "devil, anything evil, spirit monster".
Tamarin (definition) from a Cariban language, via French.
Tipi (definition) from Lakota thípi, "house".
Tupelo (definition) Perhaps from Creek ’topilwa, "swamp-tree", from íto, "tree" + opílwa, "swamp".
Wapatoo (definition) from Chinook Jargon , "arrowroot, wild potato", from Upper Chinook , a noun prefix + , which comes from Kalapuyan , "wild potato".
Wakinyan (definition) from Lakota wa, "people/things" + kiŋyaŋ, "to fly".
Yaupon (definition) from Catawba yąpą, from yą, "wood/tree" + pą, "leaf".

See also
List of placenames of indigenous origin in the Americas
List of place names in Canada of Aboriginal origin
List of place names in New England of aboriginal origin
List of Spanish words of Indigenous American Indian origin
List of Spanish words of Nahuatl origin

References

Bibliography
 Bright, William (2004). Native American Place Names of the United States. Norman: University of Oklahoma Press
 Campbell, Lyle (1997). American Indian Languages: The Historical Linguistics of Native America. Oxford: Oxford University Press
 Flexner, Stuart Berg and Leonore Crary Hauck, eds. (1987). The Random House Dictionary of the English Language [RHD], 2nd ed. (unabridged). New York: Random House.
 Siebert, Frank T. (1975). "Resurrecting Virginia Algonquian from the Dead: The Reconstituted and Historical Phonology of Powhatan". In Studies in Southeastern Indian Languages'', ed. James M. Crawford, pp. 285–453. Athens: University of Georgia Press

External links
Words in English from Amerindian Languages
Online Etymology Dictionary
Dictionary.com
Free Dictionary Translation

American English words
Americas-related lists
Indigenous languages of the Americas
Inuktitut words and phrases
Americas
Nahuatl words and phrases
Guaraní words and phrases
Quechua words and phrases
Lakota words and phrases
Native American-related lists